= Televizija Dalmacija =

Televizija Dalmacija is a Croatian commercial television station in Split. It airs programs from their offices situated at Poljud stadium. TV Dalmacija transferred Formula 1.
